Ljubomir "Ljubiša" Stanković (1945–2011), was a Serbian basketball player and administrator who spent his entire basketball career with OKK Beograd.

Playing career 
Stanković spent entire playing career with OKK Beograd during the 1960s. At the time, his teammates were Radivoj Korać, Slobodan Gordić, Miodrag Nikolić, and Trajko Rajković. He won two Yugoslav League championships and a Yugoslav Cup. He retired as a player in 1969.

Post-playing career 
After retirement in 1969, Stanković joined a management of OKK Beograd. Later, he became the club's president. His club won a Yugoslav Cup in 1993.

Stanković was one of founders and a staff member of the Crvena Zvezda Bowling Club, with whom he won two national titles (1991–92, 1992–93).

Career achievements 
As player
 Yugoslav League champion: 2 (with OKK Beograd: 1963, 1964).
 Yugoslav Cup winner: 1 (with OKK Beograd: 1962)
As executive
 Yugoslav Cup winner: 1 (with OKK Beograd: 1993)

References

1945 births
2011 deaths
Basketball players from Belgrade
OKK Beograd players
Point guards
Serbian basketball executives and administrators
Serbian men's basketball players
Yugoslav men's basketball players